The Chilapata Forest is a dense forest near Jaldapara National Park in Dooars, Alipurduar district, West Bengal, India. It is about 40 km from Alipurduar, and just a few minutes away from  Hasimara town.

Ecology

The forest forms an elephant corridor between Jaldapara National Park and the Buxa Tiger Reserve, and is rich in wildlife. New species continue to be found. The forest used to be home to large Rhinoceros populations. In hunting expeditions in 1892-1904, in and around Chilapata Forest, the Maharajah of Cooch Behar recorded killing one rhino, injury of one, and sighting of over 14. Rhinos now are extremely rare. Indian leopards are still common.

It is hoped that eco-tourism will provide a new source of income for the indigenous Rabha people, who now depend on the forest mainly for firewood.

Tourism

West Bengal State Forest Development Agency (WBSFDA) runs an eco-tourism resort at Kodalbasti, providing basic accommodation.

One of the main attractions is the ruined "Nalraja Garh", or fort of the Nal kings, built in the Gupta period in the fifth century C.E., the Golden Age of India. Although poorly maintained, the site has considerable archaeological interest. Other activities include Tonga rides through Mathura tea garden, boating on the Bania river and angling on the confluence of the Kalchini, Bania and Buri Basra.

References

External links

https://beyotee.com/chilapata

Dooars
Forests of West Bengal
Tourist attractions in Alipurduar district